Heather Alicia Simms (born February 25, 1970) is an American actress.

Early life
Born in Hartford, Connecticut. She was raised in New York City, she attended Midwood High School in Brooklyn, New York.

Career
Simms has appeared in a number of Broadway and Off-Broadway productions, including Ma Rainey's Black Bottom , A Raisin in the Sun  and Gem of the Ocean. Her film credits includes Broken Flowers (2005), The Nanny Diaries (2007), and The Light of the Moon. She also provided voice acting for All the Beautiful Things, Red Dead Revolver, Grand Theft Auto: San Andreas, Grand Theft Auto: The Ballad of Gay Tony and Mafia III.

Simms guest-starred in a number of television series, including Homicide: Life on the Street, Law & Order, Law & Order: Criminal Intent, Third Watch, and The Good Wife. She had recurring roles in the Netflix series Luke Cage in 2018 playing Auntie Ingrid, and in the Oprah Winfrey Network prime time soap opera The Kings of Napa as Yvette King in 2022.

Filmography

References

External links

1970 births
Living people
Actresses from New York City
American film actresses
American television actresses
American video game actresses
Actresses from Hartford, Connecticut
21st-century American women